Rachele Barbieri (born 21 February 1997) is an Italian professional road and track cyclist, who rides for UCI Women's Team .

She won the women's scratch race at the 2017 UCI Track Cycling World Championships. Barbieri is an athlete of the Gruppo Sportivo Fiamme Oro.

Major results

Track

2015
UEC Junior European Track Championships
1st  Team Pursuit
1st  Points Race
2nd Road Race, UEC Junior European Road Championships
2nd Points Race, 6 Giorni delle Rose - Fiorenzuola (Under-23)

2016
1st  Scratch Race, UEC Under-23 European Track Championships
2nd Overall 6 Giorni delle Rose - Fiorenzuola
1st Points Race
1st Scratch Race
2nd Omnium
2nd Scratch Race, UEC European Track Championships
National Track Championships
2nd Scratch Race
2nd Team Sprint
3rd Team Pursuit
3rd Scratch race, 3 Jours d'Aigle

2017
1st  Scratch race, UCI Track Cycling World Championships 
UEC Under-23 European Track Championships
1st  Scratch Race
2nd Madison
1st Scratch Race, UCI Track Cycling World Cup – Manchester
6 Giorni di Torino Internazionale
1st Scratch Race
2nd Points Race
3rd Omnium
3rd Madison, Belgian International Track Meeting

2018
1st  Omnium, National Track Championships

2019 
3rd Keirin, National Track Championships

2020 
2nd Elimination Race, UEC European Track Championships
2nd Elimination Race, National Track Championships

2021 
National Track Championships
1st  Madison
1st  Points Race
3rd Omnium
UEC European Track Championships
2nd Team Pursuit
3rd Omnium

2022
UEC European Track Championships
1st  Omnium
1st  Madison

Road
2022
1st ZLM Omloop der Kempen
1st Stage 3 Bloeizone Fryslân Tour
2nd Road Race, National Road Championships
2nd GP Eco Struct
3rd Scheldeprijs
3rd Veenendaal–Veenendaal
6th Dwars door Vlaanderen

See also
List of 2016 UCI Women's Teams and riders

References

External links
 

1997 births
Living people
Italian female cyclists
Sportspeople from the Province of Modena
UCI Track Cycling World Champions (women)
Italian track cyclists
Cyclists of Fiamme Oro
Olympic cyclists of Italy
Cyclists at the 2020 Summer Olympics
Cyclists from Emilia-Romagna
21st-century Italian women